West Stour may refer to

 West Stour, Dorset, a village in the English county of Dorset
 West Stour, Kent, a watercourse in the English county of Kent